Kent Ronny Oskar Larsson (3 December 1951 – 21 October 2019) was a Swedish rower. He competed in the men's coxless four event at the 1980 Summer Olympics.

References

External links
 

1951 births
2019 deaths
Swedish male rowers
Olympic rowers of Sweden
Rowers at the 1980 Summer Olympics
People from Borås
Sportspeople from Västra Götaland County